Daphnella buccinulum, common names the botanic turrid and Botany Bay turrid, is a species of sea snail, a marine gastropod mollusc in the family Raphitomidae.

Description
The length of the shell attains 7 mm, its diameter 3.75 mm.

An inflated Buccinoid species, very delicate and beautifully cancellate throughout. It contains seven whorls of which three in the protoconch. The aperture is oblong. The outer lip is thin. The sinus is indistinct.

Distribution
This marine species occurs in the Gulf of Oman.

References

External links
 

buccinulum
Gastropods described in 1903